Tiernan Killeen (born 25 March 2003) is an Irish hurler who is a member of the Galway senior team and also plays with his club Loughrea.

References

2003 births
Living people
Irish hurlers